The previous Member of Parliament for Paisley South, Gordon McMaster, of the Labour Party; died on 28 July 1997.

A by-election was held on 6 November. It was a very safe Labour seat, and despite a swing of 11% to the Scottish National Party; they did not come close to winning the constituency.

Results

General Election result, 1997

See also
 Elections in Scotland
 Lists of United Kingdom by-elections

References

External links
Scottish Election Results 1997 - present

Paisley South by-election
1990s elections in Scotland
Paisley South by-election
By-elections to the Parliament of the United Kingdom in Scottish constituencies
Paisley South by-election
Politics of Paisley, Renfrewshire